South Harwich is a village of Harwich and is located within the Harwich Port Census-designated place. South Harwich is home to much history and attractions such as the South Harwich meeting house or the Red River Beach.

References

External links
 Information

Harwich, Massachusetts
Populated coastal places in Massachusetts
Villages in Barnstable County, Massachusetts
Villages in Massachusetts